Diego Guerrero Rubio (born 26 October 1985) is a Mexican politician from the Ecologist Green Party of Mexico. From 2009 to 2011 he served as Deputy of the LXI Legislature of the Mexican Congress representing the State of Mexico.

References

1985 births
Living people
Politicians from the State of Mexico
Ecologist Green Party of Mexico politicians
21st-century Mexican politicians
Deputies of the LXI Legislature of Mexico
Members of the Chamber of Deputies (Mexico) for the State of Mexico